Raimondo Ricci (13 April 1921 – 26 November 2013) was an Italian politician and partisan, President of National Association of Italian Partisans from 2009 to 2011.

Biography 
In 1943, after the Armistice of Cassibile, Ricci decided to join the partisans, but after a few months he was arrested by the National Republican Guard, given to the Gestapo and imprisoned in the Mauthausen-Gusen concentration camp. He was freed on 5 May 1945.

Once he returned to Italy, Ricci graduated in Law and became a lawyer. He later became a city councilor in Genoa, elected with the Italian Communist Party and from 1969 he has been provincial President of ANPI in Genoa.

From 1976 to 1983, for two consecutive legislatures, Ricci has been a member of the Chamber of Deputies, elected with the PCI.

In June 2002, Ricci went to Hamburg to testify in the trial against Friedrich Engel, responsible for the Nazi massacres in Liguria when he was commander of the German police in Genoa.

After having been President of ANPI from 2009 to 2011, Ricci died in Genoa on 26 November 2013, at the age of 92.

Electoral history

References

External links 
Files about his parliamentary activities (in Italian): VII, VIII legislature.

1921 births
2013 deaths
Politicians from Rome
Italian partisans
Italian Communist Party politicians
20th-century Italian politicians
21st-century Italian politicians
Fossoli camp survivors
Mauthausen concentration camp survivors